The  is a Gymnasium in Westend, Frankfurt am Main, Germany.

The eponym is Bettina von Arnim (1785–1859). The school has approximately 71 teachers and 1,028 students.

Notable alumni 
 Omid Nouripour (born 1975), Persian-German politician, a member of Green party in Germany and a member of the German parliament (Bundestag).
 Sarah Sorge (born 1969), German politician

References

External links 
 Official website of  

Gymnasiums in Germany
Education in Frankfurt
Educational institutions established in 1855
Schools in Hesse
1855 establishments in Germany